Fernando Fernández García (born 21 December 1954) is a Mexican politician affiliated with the Institutional Revolutionary Party. As of 2014 he served as Deputy of the LIX Legislature of the Mexican Congress representing the State of Mexico.

References

1954 births
Living people
People from Puebla (city)
Institutional Revolutionary Party politicians
Politicians from Puebla
21st-century Mexican politicians
Deputies of the LIX Legislature of Mexico
Members of the Chamber of Deputies (Mexico) for the State of Mexico